The Minardi M191 was a Formula One car designed by Aldo Costa and Rene Hilhorst and built by Minardi for the 1991 Formula One season. The car was powered by the Ferrari V12 engine and ran on Goodyear tyres. Its best finish in a race was 4th (twice).

Development
For the 1991 season, team owner Giancarlo Minardi arranged a supply of Ferrari V12 engines to replace the Cosworth V8s that it had used since 1988. However, the new engines, designated 036, were actually those used by Ferrari during the 1989 season and had not received any further development. Later in the season, Minardi received 037 specification engines, which were those from Ferrari's 1990 car. 

The chassis was designed by Aldo Costa with Rene Hilhorst providing aerodynamic input.

Race history

1991
The M191 debuted in the 1991 United States Grand Prix, driven by Italians Pierluigi Martini and Gianni Morbidelli. Martini, a longtime stalwart of Minardi, scored all the points scoring finishes for the team in 1991, finishing fourth at the San Marino Grand Prix and repeating the feat in Portugal.  This meant a finish of 7th place in the Constructors' Championship, the best placing Minardi achieved in the course of its history.

Despite qualifying well on occasion (with a best of 8th place on the grid in San Marino and Japan), Morbidelli failed to score any points. His best finish was 7th at the Mexican race.  He was promoted to the Ferrari race team following the sacking of Alain Prost after the Japanese Grand Prix and was replaced by Brazilian Roberto Moreno for the last race of the year in Australia. Moreno placed 16th in that race.

1992
The team used an updated M191, designated the M191B, for the first four races of the  season before it was replaced by the Minardi M192. With it, Morbidelli, back in the team after his one-off drive for Ferrari at the tail end of the previous season, finished 7th at the Brazilian Grand Prix. It was his only finish with the M191B. New recruit Christian Fittipaldi likewise only had one finish with the M191B, 11th at the Spanish race.

Livery 
The M191 featured a mostly black livery, with few spots in yellow and white and sponsorship from SCM Group, among other companies.

Complete Formula One results
(key)

* Point scored using the M192.

Notes

References

1991 Formula One season cars
Minardi Formula One cars